The Avnillah class was a group of two ironclad warships built for the Ottoman Navy in the 1860s. The two ships were built in Britain between 1868 and 1870. They were armed with a battery of four  guns mounted in a central casemate, making them central battery ships.

Both ships served during the Russo-Turkish War of 1877–1878, where they operated against Russian forces in the Black Sea. They were primarily tasked with supporting Ottoman forces ashore, though Muin-i Zafer also helped to defend the port of Sulina. After the war, both vessels were placed in reserve, and saw no further activity until 1897, when they were mobilized at the start of the Greco-Turkish War. Like the rest of the Ottoman fleet, both ships were in poor condition and were unable to be used offensively.

After the war ended, both vessels were rebuilt as part of a large reconstruction program aimed at modernizing the ancient Ottoman fleet. They returned to service with a new battery of four  Krupp quick-firing guns as guard ships, and in this capacity Avnillah was sunk in the Battle of Beirut during the Italo-Turkish War in January 1912. Muin-i Zafer served on as a training ship from 1913, a barracks ship from 1920, and a depot ship for submarines from 1928. She was finally broken up for scrap in 1932.

Design
In 1861, Abdülaziz became sultan of the Ottoman Empire, and thereafter began a construction program to strengthen the Ottoman Navy, which had incurred heavy losses during the Crimean War of 1853–1856. The Navy ordered several ironclad warships from shipyards in Britain and France, though the program was limited by the Ottoman Empire's restricted finances.

Characteristics

The hulls were constructed with iron, incorporated a partial double bottom, and included a ram bow. The ships displaced  normally and  BOM. They had a crew of 15 officers and 130 enlisted men as built.

The ships of the Avnillah class were powered by a single horizontal compound engine which drove one screw propeller. Steam was provided by four coal-fired box boilers that were trunked into a single funnel amidships. The ships carried  of coal. A supplementary brigantine rig with two masts was also fitted.

The ships were armed with a battery of four  muzzle-loading guns that weighed  apiece, mounted in a central, armored casemate, two guns per side. The guns were positioned so as to allow any two to fire directly ahead, astern, or to either broadside. Both vessels were protected with wrought iron armor plate. The casemate had heavy armor protection, with the gun battery protected by 150 mm of iron plating.

Modifications

Both ships received a pair of  breech-loading guns manufactured by Krupp in 1882. At some point, they both also received new Scotch marine boilers, and their brigantine rig was removed, with heavy military masts installed in its place. The Ottomans planned to further strengthen the ships' armament with a pair of  Krupp guns, two  Hotchkiss revolver cannon, two  guns, also manufactured by Hotchkiss, and a  torpedo tube, but the plan came to nothing.

In 1903–1906, both ships were heavily modernized, which included the installation of a conning tower, along with a complete replacement of their armament. Their old muzzle-loading guns were replaced with new  Krupp 40-caliber guns, and a new light battery consisting of six  quick-firing (QF) Krupp guns, ten  QF Krupp guns, and two  QF Krupp guns. During their reconstruction, both vessels had their box boilers replaced with Scotch marine boilers, though they retained the original engine. Their sailing masts were removed and were replaced with heavy fighting masts. The ships' crew increased to 220 officers and enlisted.

Ships

Service history

Both ships of the class were stationed in Crete after they entered service, to assist in stabilizing the island in the aftermath of the Cretan Revolt of 1866–1869. Nevertheless, the Ottoman fleet remained largely inactive during this period. Both ships saw action during the Russo-Turkish War of 1877–1878, where they operated against Russian forces in the Black Sea. They were primarily occupied with bombarding Russian coastal positions in support of the Ottoman army in the Caucasus. They also supported an amphibious assault on the port of Sokhumi in May 1877. For the rest of the war, Muin-i Zafer was stationed in Sulina at the mouth of the Danube, while Avnillah assisted in the defense of Batumi in the Caucasus. After the war, both vessels were laid up in Constantinople, and they received a minor refit in 1882.

At the start of the Greco-Turkish War in February 1897, the Ottomans inspected the fleet and found that almost all of the vessels, including both Avnillah-class ships, to be completely unfit for combat against the Greek Navy. Following the end of the war with Greece, the government decided to begin a naval reconstruction program. The two ships were rebuilt by Gio. Ansaldo & C. between 1903 and 1906 at the Ottoman Imperial Arsenal, which was in part leased to Ansaldo. After returning to service, both ships were reduced to guard ships in 1910. At the outbreak of the Italo-Turkish War in September 1911, Avnillah was stationed in Beirut, where on 24 February 1912, two Italian armored cruisers— and —attacked the port in the Battle of Beirut. During the action, the Italians hit Avnillah with multiple shells and then torpedoed her, sinking her in the harbor. Muin-i Zafer was meanwhile disarmed at Port Said so her guns could be used to strengthen the defenses of the city. In 1913, she became a torpedo training ship, and in 1920 she was converted into a barracks ship, before becoming a depot ship for submarines in 1928. Decommissioned in 1932, she was broken up thereafter.

Notes

References